George "Thunder" Ayeh is a Ghanaian professional feather/super feather/lightweight boxer of the 1980s and '90s who won the Ghanaian featherweight title, Commonwealth featherweight title, and Commonwealth super featherweight title, his professional fighting weight varied from , i.e. featherweight to , i.e. lightweight.

References

External links

Featherweight boxers
Lightweight boxers
Living people
Place of birth missing (living people)
Super-featherweight boxers
Year of birth missing (living people)
Ghanaian male boxers